In mathematics, assembly maps are an important concept in geometric topology. From the homotopy-theoretical viewpoint, an assembly map is a universal approximation of a homotopy invariant functor by a homology theory from the left. From the geometric viewpoint, assembly maps correspond to 'assemble' local data over a parameter space together to get global data.

Assembly maps for algebraic K-theory and L-theory play a central role in the topology of high-dimensional manifolds, since their homotopy fibers have a direct geometric

Homotopy-theoretical viewpoint
It is a classical result that for any generalized homology theory  on the category of topological spaces (assumed to be homotopy equivalent to CW-complexes), there is a spectrum  such that

where .

The functor  from spaces to spectra has the following properties:
 It is homotopy-invariant (preserves homotopy equivalences). This reflects the fact that  is homotopy-invariant.
 It preserves homotopy co-cartesian squares. This reflects the fact that  has Mayer-Vietoris sequences, an equivalent characterization of excision.
 It preserves arbitrary coproducts.
A functor from spaces to spectra fulfilling these properties is called excisive.

Now suppose that  is a homotopy-invariant, not necessarily excisive functor. An assembly map is a natural transformation  from some excisive functor  to  such that  is a homotopy equivalence.

Assembly maps exist for any homotopy invariant functor, by a simple homotopy-theoretical construction.

Geometric viewpoint
In a cycle representation of the associated homology theory, this means that all cycles must be representable by small cycles. For instance, for singular homology, the excision property is proved by subdivision of simplices, obtaining sums of small simplices representing arbitrary homology classes.

In this spirit, for certain homotopy-invariant functors which are not excisive, the corresponding excisive theory may be constructed by imposing 'control conditions', leading to the field of controlled topology. In this picture, assembly maps are 'forget-control' maps, i.e. they are induced by forgetting the control conditions.

Importance in geometric topology
In fact, the homotopy fibers of both assembly maps have a direct geometric interpretation when  is a compact topological manifold. Therefore, knowledge about the geometry of compact topological manifolds may be obtained by studying - and -theory and their respective assembly maps.

Moreover, the fibration sequence

This may be called the fundamental theorem of surgery theory and was developed subsequently by William Browder, Sergei Novikov, Dennis Sullivan, C. T. C. Wall, Frank Quinn, and Andrew Ranicki.

This fact is called the stable parametrized h-cobordism theorem, proven by Waldhausen-Jahren-Rognes.

Surgery theory
K-theory